Ines Schulz (born 10 July 1965) is a German former athlete. She competed in the women's heptathlon at the 1988 Summer Olympics.

References

External links
 

1965 births
Living people
Athletes (track and field) at the 1988 Summer Olympics
German heptathletes
Olympic athletes of East Germany
Sportspeople from Chemnitz
20th-century German women
21st-century German women